Ľubica is a large village and municipality in Kežmarok District in the Prešov Region of north Slovakia. It is now a mostly housing development district with many panel block houses.

History
In historical records the village was first mentioned in 1271. The village was formerly known as Leibitz, as a city of Czechoslovakia (1918 - 1990), and previously of Hungary (1000 - 1918).

Martin Luther's Ninety-Five Theses were first read publicly in Ľubica in 1521 by Thomas Preisner.

Geography
The municipality lies at an altitude of 630 metres and covers an area of 26.421 km². It has a population of about 4,507 people.

References

External links 
 

Villages and municipalities in Kežmarok District